Allen Henry "Jake" Spearman (November 16, 1909 – June 1980) was an American baseball third baseman in the Negro leagues. He played from 1935 to 1946 with several teams. Four of his brothers, Charles, Clyde, Willie, and Codie, and his nephew Fred also played in the Negro leagues.

References

External links
 and Baseball-Reference Black Baseball stats and Seamheads

1909 births
1980 deaths
Birmingham Black Barons players
Philadelphia Stars players
New York Black Yankees players
Pittsburgh Crawfords players
New York Cubans players
Newark Eagles players
Homestead Grays players
Baseball players from Arkansas
People from Arkadelphia, Arkansas
20th-century African-American sportspeople
Baseball infielders